Bursadella is a genus of moths in the family Immidae.

Species
 Bursadella acribes (Durrant, 1916)
 Bursadella dichroalis Snellen, 1880
 Bursadella endoneurias (Meyrick, 1925)
 Bursadella grammatistis (Meyrick, 1906)
 Bursadella grammozona (Meyrick, 1925)
 Bursadella mesolampra (Meyrick, 1927)
 Bursadella minatrix (Meyrick, 1906)
 Bursadella ramosa (Durrant, 1915)
 Bursadella timetica (Durrant, 1915)
 Bursadella tonans (Meyrick, 1925)
 Bursadella tyroplaca (Meyrick, 1925)

References

Immidae
Moth genera